Ava Alexander may refer to:

Eva Alexander (born 1976), pronounced Ava, TV presenter
Ava Alexander, character in Up All Night (TV series)